Charles Gray Printing Shop was a historic commercial building located at Wilmington, New Castle County, Delaware. It was built in 1874, and was a three-story, commercial/office building with a rectangular plan built of wall bearing brick construction.  It featured a half-octagonal display window and is in the Italianate style.  The building was demolished and replaced with an office of the University of Delaware.

It was added to the National Register of Historic Places in 1985.

References

Commercial buildings on the National Register of Historic Places in Delaware
Italianate architecture in Delaware
Commercial buildings completed in 1874
Buildings and structures in Wilmington, Delaware
National Register of Historic Places in Wilmington, Delaware
1874 establishments in Delaware